The Joint Support Coordination Cell (JSCC) is the planned security and defence (CSDP) body of the European Union's (EU) European External Action Service (EEAS) that will provide for relations between the civilian and military planning and conduct capabilities, abbreviated CPCC and MPCC, respectively, in the context of civilian and military missions missions.

Tasks
The JSCC would unite the following civilian-military support functions:
24/7 watchkeeping functions of the European Union Military Staff (EUMS)
Legal advice (in coordination with the Legal Affairs Division of the EEAS)
Expertise on United Nations Security Council Resolution 1325 (and subsequent resolutions)
Strategic communications (STRATCOM)
Logistics
Communications and information services (CIS)
Medical support
Field security
Cyber
Premises

The organisation of the JSCC is set to build upon previous experience from the now-defunct European Union Operations Centre (EU OPCEN).

Organisation
The MPCC and CPCC will both provide staff for the cell and ensure sharing of expertise in the areas of mission planning, conduct and support. The chiefs of the staff of the MPCC and CPCC are set to coordinate the daily work of the civilian/military teams of the JSCC, who would be co-located where possible. Administratively they would remain part of the MPCC/EUMS or the CPCC respectively, and the civilian and military lines of command would remain separate and distinct.

Role in the command and control structure

See also
Civilian Planning and Conduct Capability
Military Planning and Conduct Capability

References

External links

Common Security and Defence Policy bodies of the European External Action Service